The term "clique graph" may refer to:
 Complete graph, a graph in which every two vertices are adjacent
 Clique (graph theory), a complete subgraph
 Clique graph, the intersection graph of maximal cliques
 Simplex graph, a graph with a vertex for each clique in the original graph, with an edge between vertices that represent cliques that differ by exactly one vertex

See also
Cluster graph, a graph in which each component is a clique